Leroy Anderson (1908–1975) was an American composer.

Leroy Anderson may also refer to:
Leroy Anderson Elementary School
LeRoy H. Anderson (1906–1991), U.S. Representative from the State of Montana
Leroy Anderson, part of the Canadian duo 'Donna & Leroy' signed with Boot Records

See also
Lee Anderson (disambiguation)